The Men's individual pursuit LC4 track cycling event at the 2008 Summer Paralympics was competed on 9 September. It was won by Paolo Vigano, representing .

Qualifying

9 Sept. 2008, 10:15

Final round

9 Sept. 2008, 16:35
Gold

Bronze

References

M